Prem Nath Dogra (24 October 1884 – 21 March 1972), also known as Pandit Prem Nath Dogra, was a leader from Jammu and Kashmir who worked for total integration of the state with India. He is commonly referred to as Sher e Duggar. He was instrumental in forming the Jammu Praja Parishad party in 1947 along with Balraj Madhok and opposed the policies  of Sheikh Abdullah. He was later elected the president of Bharatiya Jana Sangh in 1955 for a brief period. He dedicated himself to the service of downtrodden poor and proletariat part of society.

Early life
Prem Nath Dogra was born on October 24, 1884, in Smailpur village, Jammu, as the only child of Pandit Anant Ram to a Dogra Brahmin family. He spent early life in Lahore for studies. He graduated with a Bachelor of Arts in 1908.

Jammu Praja Parishad
As president of the Jammu and Kashmir Praja Parishad in 1949, Dogra was arrested along with hundreds of members of the party for demanding only the Indian flag remain official. He was arrested again on November 26, 1952, during a demonstration against the hoisting of both the state and Indian flag in Jammu. The arrest and further developments led to the Praja Parishad agitation spreading to other parts of Jammu and Kashmir.

See also
 Ikkjutt Jammu
 Jammu and Kashmir Workers Party
 Bharatiya Janata Party
 Syama Prasad Mukherjee
 Girdhari Lal Dogra

References

Further reading 
 
 

Dogra
People from Jammu district
People from Jammu and Kashmir
1884 births
1972 deaths
Politicians from Jammu
Dogra people
Bharatiya Jana Sangh politicians from Jammu and Kashmir
Bharatiya Jana Sangh politicians
Jammu and Kashmir MLAs 1957–1962
Jammu and Kashmir MLAs 1962–1967
Jammu and Kashmir MLAs 1967–1972